Peter Milo Shane (born 1952) is a law professor and writer. His best-known scholarly work focuses mainly on two subjects.  The first is separation of powers law, especially law and the presidency.  His work often explores what he calls an institutional conception of the rule of law in a separation of powers regime.  See, e.g., Peter M, Shane, When Inter-branch Norms Break Down: Of Arms-for-Hostages, 'Orderly Shutdowns,' Presidential Impeachments, and Judicial 'Coups,' 12 Cornell Journal of Law and Public Policy 503 (2004). Under Shane's antiformalist conception, the rule of law is sustained not only by formal legal rules, but perhaps most importantly, by informal norms and conventional behaviors designed to maintain interbranch accountability even when public officials could ignore formal rules with impunity.  Peter M. Shane, Madison's Nightmare:  How Executive Power Threatens American Democracy 116 (University of Chicago Press, 2009). Checks and balances in such a system likewise "depend on an assemblage of norms, cooperative arrangements, and informal coordination activities."  Id.  Following political scientist Kenneth Shepsle, Shane thus calls the rule of law "an unstructured institution."  Id.  at 117.Shane's second major focus is cyberdemocracy.  He is particularly interested in the potential of online government initiatives to engage the public more fully in actual policy making. He is a prominent member of the "cyberrealist school," which rejects technological determinism of both the utopian and dystopian kind.  He argues that the democratic potential of digital information technologies depends significantly on human agency, although he perceives the structures of power in society as limiting the impact of any specific initiative.  See, e.g., Peter M. Shane, Democracy Online:  The Prospects for Political Renewal Through the Internet (Routledge, 2004).Madison's Nightmare'' is the major synthesis of Shane's separation of powers views.  It both describes and analyzes the theory and practice of "presidentialism" as they unfolded from 1981 to 2009. He describes the period of 1981 to 2009 as a time of aggressive presidentialism.  Presidents Ronald Reagan through George W. Bush made arguments for unilateral presidential authority that Shane characterizes as unprecedented and legally groundless.  These arguments (and the actual assertions of power they supported) went so far beyond the claims of prior presidents as to constitute a new and distinctive phenomenon.  Shane's critique, however, goes beyond his attack on presidentialism as legal doctrine.  He also argues that presidentialism, as an operating ethos of government, undermines sound decision making and the rule of law in executive branch affairs.  He illustrates many of his points through examples from the G. W. Bush administration, but argues that his analysis transcends party.  His view is that, for presidents of either party, presidentialism can subvert the quality of decision making, policy makers' attentiveness to law, and democratic accountability more generally.  

Shane took his degrees at Harvard College and Yale Law School.  He was dean of the University of Pittsburgh School of Law from 1994–1998 and, as a faculty member at Carnegie Mellon University Heinz College, directed the Institute for the Study of Information Technology and Society.  He is currently the Jacob E. Davis and Jacob E. Davis II Chair in Law at the Moritz College of Law at The Ohio State University, where he has taught since 2003.   He also served Executive Director of the Knight Commission on the Information Needs of Communities in a Democracy.

References

External links
 Peter M. Shane bibliography at OSU
 Personal website
 Shane's articles at Huffington Post
 

Living people
1952 births
Harvard University alumni
Carnegie Mellon University faculty
University of Pittsburgh faculty
Ohio State University faculty
Moritz College of Law faculty
Deans of law schools in the United States
American legal scholars
Yale Law School alumni
Date of birth missing (living people)